Jing Yali (born 25 May 1989) is a track cyclist from China. She represented her nation at the 2014 and 2015 UCI Track Cycling World Championships, and at the 2015 Asian Cycling Championships, where she won a gold medal in team pursuit.

Jing competed for the Chinese track cycling team in the women's team pursuit at the 2016 Summer Olympics in Rio de Janeiro. There, she delivered the foursome of Huang Dongyan, Ma Menglu, and Zhao Baofang a seventh-place time and an Asian track cycling record of 4:23.678 in the semifinals, losing the opening heat to the Italian squad by almost a full second.

Major results
2014
Asian Track Championships
1st  Individual Pursuit
1st  Team Pursuit (with Huang Dongyan, Jiang Wenwen and Zhao Baofang)
1st  Team Pursuit, Asian Games (with Huang Dongyan, Jiang Wenwen and Zhao Baofang)
2015
1st  Team Pursuit, Asian Track Championships (with Huang Dongyan, Jiang Wenwen and Zhao Baofang)
3rd Omnium, China Track Cup
2017
1st  Team Pursuit, National Track Championships (with Huang Dongyan, Ma Menglu and Wang Hong)

References

External links
 

1989 births
Chinese female cyclists
Living people
Asian Games medalists in cycling
Cyclists at the 2014 Asian Games
Asian Games gold medalists for China
Medalists at the 2014 Asian Games
Olympic cyclists of China
Cyclists at the 2016 Summer Olympics
21st-century Chinese women